Flashman is a 1967 Italian film directed by Mino Loy and written by Ernesto Gastaldi.

Cast
 Paolo Gozlino as Lord Alex Burman / John Smith / Flashman
 Claudie Lange as Alika
 Ivano Staccioli as Kid
 Jacques Ary as Inspector Baxter
 Micaela Pignatelli as Nevenka
 Anne Marie Williams as Sheila

Production
For the script Ernesto Gastaldi was inspired by H.G. Wells' novella The Invisible Man. Gastaldi noted that the starting point for the film's development was comic books and director Mino Loy's desire to develop a film with special effects involving partially reflecting mirrors. It was directed by Mino Loy, whose real name was Guglielmo Loy Donà. It was his third last film as a director.

 acted in the film under the name Paul Stevens. Gozlino was a well-known dancer and choreographer in Italy mostly due to his appears in many television shows.

Release and reception
Flashman was released in Italy in 1967 where it was distributed by Indipendenti Regionali.

In a retrospective film historian Roberto Curti noted that the special effects vary in quality throughout the film, ranging from objects on visible fishing wire and poor miniature work while praising the work on the invisibility effects.

See also
 List of Italian films of 1967

References

Footnotes

Sources

External links
 

Italian superhero films
Italian science fiction films
1960s science fiction films
Films about invisibility
Film superheroes
1960s superhero films
Films with screenplays by Ernesto Gastaldi
Films produced by Luciano Martino
1960s Italian films